The Forgotten World of Uloc is a short children's fantasy novel by Canadian author Bryan Buchan. First published in 1970 by Scholastic-Tab Publications, it features black-and-white line drawings of key scenes by Canadian artist Kathryn Cole.

The Forgotten World of Uloc is a tale of a young boy's discovery of a world of magic and nature spirits that are currently threatened by pollution.

References

1970 Canadian novels
1970 children's books
Canadian children's novels
Canadian fantasy novels
Children's fantasy novels
Scholastic Corporation books